"Don't Mess with My Man" is the second single from American R&B group Lucy Pearl and the second single taken from their debut self-titled album. The song was released to urban radio on August 15, 2000.

The song was the group's biggest success in the United Kingdom, peaking at number 20 on the UK Singles Chart. It also found some success in Iceland, where it peaked at number two, and in France, where it peaked at number 14. In the United States, the song was not as successful as debut single "Dance Tonight", peaking outside of the Billboard Hot 100.

"Don't Mess with My Man" was also the group's last single with band member Dawn Robinson. In 2014, the song was sampled by Ed Sheeran for his single "Don't".

Track listing
UK CD single
 "Don't Mess with My Man" (album version) [3:43]
 "Don't Mess with My Man" (Mood II Swing edit) [3:40] 	
 "Don't Mess with My Man" (Wookie radio mix) [6:18]
 "Don't Mess with My Man" (video)

Charts

Release history

Booty Luv version

"Don't Mess with My Man" was released as the third single from the debut album of UK dance music duo Booty Luv. It was released on September 3, 2007, two weeks before their debut album was released, and reach number 11 on the UK Singles Chart.

Track listings
UK CD1
 "Don't Mess with My Man" (radio edit)
 "Don't Mess with My Man" (Seamus Haji Big Love remix)

UK CD2
 "Don't Mess with My Man" (radio edit)
 "Don't Mess with My Man" (extended)
 "Don't Mess with My Man" (Seamus Haji Big Love remix)
 "Don't Mess with My Man" (Thomas Gold remix)
 "Don't Mess with My Man" (Ryden's live edit)

UK promo CD
 "Don't Mess with My Man" (radio edit)
 "Don't Mess with My Man" (extended)
 "Don't Mess with My Man" (Seamus Haji Big Love remix)
 "Don't Mess with My Man" (Thomas Gold disco remix)
 "Don't Mess with My Man" (Thomas Gold disco rub)
 "Don't Mess with My Man" (Soul Survivors remix)
 "Don't Mess with My Man" (instrumental)

Charts

References

2000 singles
2000 songs
2007 singles
Booty Luv songs
Songs written by Ali Shaheed Muhammad
Songs written by Dawn Robinson
Songs written by Raphael Saadiq
Virgin Records singles